is a 2014 Japanese tokusatsu television drama. It is the fourth television series in the Garo metaseries, this time focusing on the character of Raiga Saezima, the son of the original protagonist Kouga, who takes on the mantle of the Golden Knight Garo. The series began broadcast on April 4, 2014, on TV Tokyo and its sister stations in the TX Network.

Plot
The story continues after the events of  The Flash Knight, Saejima Kouga (mini-series), and  Makai Tales. Kouga and Kaoru got married and had a son, Raiga Saejima. Kouga's journey as Garo has ended and Raiga has now succeeded him as the next golden knight.

Prologue
Approximately 20 years ago, two major events would happen that would bring about the convergence of two knights: the disappearance of Raiga's parents and the death of a priestess. When Raiga was 6 years old, Kouga and Kaoru had a family outing when an inter-dimensional portal opened and took away Kaoru. Unwilling to lose his wife, Kouga decided to jump through the portal as well. Kouga promised Raiga he will find Kaoru and return home one day.

Separate from events, a pregnant Makai Priestess was attacked by a horror and was being possessed. Unwilling to allow her baby to be devoured, the priestess endowed her child with the power to seal horrors. While her mother died, the baby lived and the priests would realize the infant has a darkness vault inside of her. Priest Shido would name her Mayuri and placed magical spells upon her to protect Mayuri from her container becoming unstable. Treated only as a magical tool, she is sealed away and placed in slumber unless needed to seal unique dark entities.

About 4 years after Kouga's disappearance, Raiga would resolve to train himself as the next Garo. It was around this time that he would encounter Priestess Akari, the lover to Eiji Busujima (Senatorial Knight, Giru the Heretic Bone Knight, and leader of the Shadow Knights). Although a brief meeting, Raiga gave Akari a bell that represented a sound of light. Sadly, Akari would die not long. Suffering from a terminal disease, Eiji watched as Akari faded away. Unwilling to let her go, Eiji accessed Mayuri and placed Akari's soul within Mayuri's container until he can figure a means to bring back her body. He believes if he can reunite Akari's soul and body together, he can resurrect her. However, it wouldn't happen for years to come.

Upon Raiga's 10th birthday, Silver Knight Zero arrived to fulfill his promise to Kouga. Rei promised to train Raiga to become a Makai Knight if he doesn't return. After verifying his resolve, Zero accepted Raiga as his disciple and made him a full fledged knight. After all of his trials, Raiga entered the Tower of Heroic Spirits (the tower that houses the Garo armor) to earn the right to succeed as the next Garo. To his surprise, the guardian spirits denied him the armor because Kouga still wears it. Shocked to realize his father still lives, the spirits told him Kouga relinquishes the armor to him and allows Raiga to begin his journey as the next Garo.

Main Story
The story begins with Makai Knight Eiji Busujima, breaking into a museum. Eiji learned that civilians discovered the stone slab that sealed the horror Eyrith and mistook it as an ancient relic. Eyrith is known to bring back the dead; Eiji was hoping to use Eyrith's power to resurrect Akari. The slab itself are the collection of 9 horrors that were used to help contain Eyrith; Eiji broke the seal and unleashed the Ady Slab Horrors just to get to Eyrith. Even though the seal is broken, Eyrith will only appear when the last Ady Slab Horror is captured; he goes into hiding and waits to strike. 

Raiga has been assigned to teamed up with Mayuri and Shadow Knight Crow to find all the Ady Slab Horrors and re-seal Eyrith. As the team reached to the last Ady Slab Horror, Eiji reappears and kidnaps both the horror and Mayuri to enact his plan. Exposing Eyrith, Eiji negotiates reviving Akari in exchange for Eyrith's revival. Taking a lock of Akari's hair as a genetic template, Eyrith cloned a body of Akari and Eiji planned to open Mayuri's container to restore Akari when Raiga and Crow intervened.

While Garo fought against Giru, Crow attempted to save Mayuri. Eyrith planned to possess Mayuri but Crow offered himself in exchange for her safety. Taking over Crow's body, Eyrith appeared before Raiga and Eiji. She destroyed Akari's cloned body and flew away; everything that Eiji had planned for is ruined. Raiga gave chase as Crow flew away to a pond to bloom. Without any need for Crow, Eyrith left Crow's body and began sprouting herself into a massive demonic tree. 

Garo attempted to stop Eyrith and faced her true form within the tree. It has been revealed Eyrith was responsible for opening various portals through time and space, including the portal that took away his parents. Eyrith tried to tempt Raiga to save his parents, but he resisted. While fighting Garo, Eyrith managed to accelerate the armor's time limit. Losing control, Garo became a Lost Soul Beast and begun rampaging towards his own allies. It was while rampaging that Raiga heard the same bell he had given Akari all those years ago and it helped him come to his senses. He overcame the lost soul beast state and became Luminous Garo to slay Eyrith. With Eyrith weakened, Raiga had Mayuri seal Eyrith back into the stone slab. Although the day seemed to be victorious, Mayuri's well-being is in danger.

Mayuri's container is temperamental and can be affected by her thoughts and emotions; Priest Shido's magical safety precautions includes her going back to slumber whenever a mission is over and lose all memory of it. Because she got in touch with her humanity during her time with Raiga, Mayuri doesn't want to forget nor lose the bonds she has created. Because of her resistance, her container has become corrupted and could kill her. To save Mayuri's life, Raiga entered her spirit and destroyed the container within her. After several days of rest, Mayuri awakened with her memories intact and Raiga smiled back in joy. This would begin a new chapter for the both of them and their story continues through  Makai Tales and Moonbow Traveler.

Episodes

On April 4, 2014, TV Tokyo broadcast a special program titled .

Cast
: 
: 
: 
: 
: 
: 
: 
: 
: 
:

Theme songs
Opening themes

Composition & Arrangement: Shiho Terada, Yoshichika Kuriyama, Yoichi Matsuo
Artist: Masaaki Endoh, Masami Okui, Hiroshi Kitadani

Lyrics & Composition: Hironobu Kageyama
Arrangement: Kenichi Sudō
Artist: JAM Project
Ending themes

Composition: Noriyasu Agematsu (Elements Garden)
Arrangement: Evan Call (Elements Garden)
Lyrics & Artist: Faylan
"my memory, your memory"
Lyrics & Composition: Masami Okui
Arrangement: Shiho Terada, Yoshichika Kuriyama
Artist: JAM Project

References

External links

Garo: Makai no Hana at TV Tokyo

Japanese horror fiction television series
Garo (TV series)
TV Tokyo original programming
2014 Japanese television series debuts
2014 Japanese television series endings
Tokusatsu television series
Martial arts television series